Brain and Mind Research Institute may refer to:

Brain and Mind Centre, Sydney, Australia
Brain and Mind Research Institute at the University of Ottawa Faculty of Medicine, Ontario, Canada
Feil Family Brain and Mind Research Institute at Weill Cornell Medicine, New York City, United States